The Taniwharau Rugby League Club is a rugby league club from Huntly, New Zealand. They compete in the Waikato Rugby League and WaiCoa club competitions. The club plays in a green and gold strip and are based at Waahi Pa Huntly.

History
Taniwharau, founded in 1944 by Tonga Mahuta, is the most successful club in Huntly, a town which once boasted four rugby league clubs, the Rangiriri Eels, Huntly South, Huntly United and Taniwharau.

The club won 11 straight Waikato premierships during the 1970-80's. Taniwharau also won the inaugural Waicoa Bay championship in 2002 and again in 2007 a year in which they went through the season unbeaten; a feat that has never been achieved before at the Waikato Rugby League Premier Level. Taniwharau were able to win the reformed Waikato Rugby League title in 2008 and 2009.

Notable past & present players

Lance Hohaia (New Zealand International)
Wairangi Koopu (New Zealand international)
Herewini Rangi (New Zealand Warriors player)
Andy Berryman (New Zealand international)
Steve Berryman (Cook Islands international)
Don Parkinson (New Zealand international)
Rick Muru (New Zealand international)
Austin Dias (Wests Tigers Player)

References

External links
 Taniwharau at Waahi Pa

New Zealand rugby league teams
Rugby league in the Waikato
Māori sport
Huntly, New Zealand